Kõpu may refer to several places in Estonia:

Kõpu Parish, municipality in Viljandi County
Kõpu, small borough in Kõpu Parish
Kõpu, Hiiu County, village in Hiiu Parish, Hiiu County
Kõpu, Jõgeva County, village in Pajusi Parish, Jõgeva County
Kõpu, Pärnu County, village in Tõstamaa Parish, Pärnu County

See also
Kopu (disambiguation)
Kõpu Lighthouse